Pycnaxis is a genus of Asian crab spiders first described by Eugène Simon in 1895. They are endemic to eastern Asia from China to the Philippines.

Species 
 it contains seven species:
 Pycnaxis guttata Simon, 1895 - Philippines
 Pycnaxis krakatauensis (Bristowe, 1931) - Krakatau	
 Pycnaxis lamellaris (Tang & Li, 2010) - China
 Pycnaxis nigrostriata (Simon, 1886) - Vietnam
 Pycnaxis onoi (Zhang, Zhu & Tso, 2006) - Taiwan
 Pycnaxis truciformis (Bösenberg & Strand, 1906) - China, Korea, Taiwan, Japan
 Pycnaxis tumida (Tang & Li, 2010) - China

References

Thomisidae
Araneomorphae genera
Spiders of Asia